Erindi Private Game Reserve is a protected wildlife and ecological reserve in Namibia, southeast of the city of Omaruru. It is a private, fenced reserve located on the Namibian central plateau, populated with semi-open bush savannah and sparse, rugged mountains. The land on which Erindi was founded, has been reclaimed as part of a massive rehabilitation and conservation venture.  The owners, Chris Joubert, and his brother Gert Joubert, originally bought the 70,719 hectares of land with the intention of going into cattle farming. It was soon realized that farming cattle is an extremely costly practice, and they abandoned the idea in favor of a private game reserve. The resulting aim was to restore endemic species to the area, with the intention that they would once again thrive there, and an ecotourism lodge and safari business would be built to provide income from the land.

Since 1998, management of Erindi Private Game Reserve has ensured the recovery of the ecological balance between vegetation, herbivores, and predators, so that the numbers and diversity of species lead to sustainable land utilization and socio-economic benefits for all in the area.

Origin of name 
“Erindi” is a word taken from the local Herero language, meaning “place of water”.

History 
European traders and missionaries were the first recorded people who travelled through the area of Namibia that now contains Erindi, probably from Walvis Bay northwards in the direction of Ovamboland in the mid-1800s.  But evidence shows that other people used to inhabit this land such as the indigenous Herero and San tribes. There are signs of seasonal Herero farmers having moved through the area, as well as significant San rock paintings and engravings on “Big Bushman” Mountain. In 1986, the Joubert brothers bought the land from the Imperial Cold Storage and Supply Company (ICS). They were determined to turn it into a model cattle farm, so they invested money, time and energy into the project. By the early 1990s, the brothers realized that to increase overall profitability of the farm, they would need to gradually start stocking the farm with game. Natural food resources was a major concern, so to avoid competition with the cattle, they introduced plains game. They fenced 3,000 hectares and put 55 giraffes on it in 1992. This was a noticeably successful venture, so more game such as the Blue Wildebeest and African Elephant were brought in from Etosha National Park. The farm was already home to wild animals such as the Gemsbok, Kudu, Leopard, Cheetah, Honey-Badger, Baboon and many others.

However, to concentrate fully on conservation and turn Erindi into an ecotourism destination, the owners realized that the land would have to be briefly utilized for hunting purposes. A four-year period as a trophy hunting outfitter helped to raise the much-needed funds to continue their conservation dreams. Cattle farming had been completely phased out, and the reserve had been fitted with all the game management requirements. By 2008, Old Traders Lodge was erected and open for visitors. Since then, Camp Elephant was constructed, and several successful conservation programs run concurrently.

Geology 
Erindi Private Game Reserve is situated on a central plateau in the highlands of Namibia. The terrain is a combination of soils eroded from neighboring mountains. In the west of the reserve, the Erongo Mountains have been linked to the Post-Karoo Complex. The main geology of the area is granite, basalt, and volcanic rocks. While to the east, the Omataku Mountains are inselbergs, which rise sporadically throughout the plains. These consist of Etjo sandstone and magmatic rock. This was formed millions of years ago. Erindi Private Game Reserve shows characteristics of both mountain ranges. Two perennial rivers flow through the reserve. In the south, the Slang River flows when there is a heavy rainfall, and just outside the northern boundary, is the Otjimakuru River.

Climate 
In Omaruru, the summers are long, hot, and partly cloudy; the winters are short, cool, windy, and clear; and it is dry year round. Over the course of the year, the temperature typically varies from 9 °C to 34 °C (49 °F to 94 °F) and is rarely below 5 °C (42 °F) or above 38 °C (100 °F). Namibia itself has extreme temperatures that fluctuate greatly between day and night. In summer the minimum summer temperature recorded is 17 °C and the maximum 43 °C. In winter temperatures range between 1 °C at night and 28 °C during the day.

Vegetation 
Erindi Private Game Reserve has vegetation ranging from savannah plains to thorny bushveld and rocky mountains. It is classified as an arid to semi-arid category.  Ephemeral rivers that flow after heavy rainfall weave in and around the reserve, providing relief to large trees. The plant life is diverse, and unique species manage to flourish in the harsh conditions. Endemic plants include the Phantom tree; tall succulent Kobas, and numerous Acacia species. There are over 72 tree species, 75 grass species and an unknown number of flower species in Erindi Private Game Reserve. Scientists have recorded many of the species, but this research is ongoing.

Wildlife 
The region where Erindi was founded, had many naturally occurring animal species in fairly large numbers. After cattle farming was phased out, the owners decided to reintroduce more endemic species to the region and give the existing plains species a chance to thrive. Erindi Private Game Reserve is home to many wildlife conservation projects.

Carnivores 
The large carnivores that can be found in the reserve include the cheetah (Acinonyx jubatus), leopard (Panthera pardus), lion (Panthera leo), brown hyena (Parahyaena brunnea), spotted hyena (Crocuta crocuta), and African wilddog (Lycaon pictus).

Medium-sized carnivores include the serval (Leptilaurus serval), caracal (Caracal caracal), African wildcat (Felis lybica), bat-eared fox (Otocyon megalotis), black-backed jackal (Lupulella mesomelas), Cape fox (Vulpes chama), ground pangolin (Manis teminckii), aardvark (Orycteropus afer), aardwolf (Proteles cristatus), and honey badger (Mellivora capensis).

Small carnivores include the striped polecat (Ictonyx striatus), the small-spotted genet (Genetta genetta), yellow mongoose (Cynictis penicillata), Kaokoland slender mongoose (Galerella flavescens), banded mongoose (Mungos mungo), and meerkat (Suricata suricatta).

Global Leopard Project 
In Namibia, leopards (Panthera pardus) are considered ‘problem animals’ since farmers perceive them as a threat to livestock. As a result, these creatures are now considered elusive as they have had to adapt to a hostile environment, in which heavy persecution is rife. In 2010, the Namibian Ministry of Environment and Tourism declared a moratorium on leopard hunting and in 2011 launched a census programme to try to manage the sustainability of the leopard population. The stability of Leopard populations is governed by complex interactions between individuals and thus groups must be studied on a long-term basis to understand the positions of individual leopards within a group. Their shy and elusive nature compounds the challenge of observing them closely and over sustained periods for research.

The Global Leopard Project is a registered foundation established in Erindi Private Game Reserve in 2007, with research, communication, and conservation as the core strategy. Many Erindi leopards are studied, tracked and monitored using visuals and GPS collars. The data collected from these wild leopards is shared widely to assist in the sustainable use of the species by other researchers, farmers, hunters, and any other interested parties. Guests at Erindi can support the foundation by participating in the specialized Leopard Project Drive, Leopard Project Presentation and Leopard Project Walk.

Cheetah Conservation Project 
Namibia has the largest and healthiest population of cheetahs left in the world. The cheetah, Acinonyx jubatus, is classified as ‘vulnerable’ in the IUCN Red List. Cheetah’s are one of Africa’s most endangered big cats, whose numbers have declined by 90% over the past century. There are only about 7,100 cheetahs left in the wild today. The main reason for the decline is human-wildlife conflict, disappearing habitat, poaching by humans and the illegal taking of cheetahs from the wild for the exotic pet trade, and loss of sufficient prey base.

Erindi Private Game Reserve has been involved with cheetah conservation for more than two decades, and provides a semi-protected home for cheetah rehabilitation and release.

During early 2000, work between Erindi and the Cheetah Conservation Fund (CCF) began with a project to regularly introduce rehabilitated cheetah into Erindi's ecosystems. These animals were mostly those that had been captured on farms hunting livestock, and who were therefore doomed under the ‘problem animal’ label, and others were cubs illegally taken from the wild, that had spent their entire lives in human care.

The first four cheetahs released onto Erindi had first undergone intensive rehabilitation and rewilding training with CCF to ensure that they could learn how to hunt and survive independently. The careful preparation was worth it, as they thrived after their release into the reserve.

Another group of four cheetahs was released into Erindi in 2012, and since then more cheetahs have been successfully rewilded into the Erindi landscape, including a female that has now raised a litter of wild cubs. Released cheetahs are normally fitted with special GPS monitoring collars by which conservation staff can follow and monitor their movements and behaviors in the time after release. Monitoring is undertaken in order to assist reserve planning efforts, and to provide care, medical treatment, supplemental food and water if needed, or to facilitate the recapture of an animal that needs more intense assistance or recovery.

In 2014, Erindi Private Game Reserve was invited to the Annual CCF Gala and presented with the award for the 2014 Cheetah Conservation Business of the Year by Dr Laurie Marker and Uahekua Herunga, Namibia’s Minister of Environment and Tourism.

African Wild Dog Project 
The African wild dog, or African Painted Dog (Lycaon pictus)), is native to Sub-Saharan Africa. It is the largest wild canine in Africa, and the only extant member of the genus Lycaon, it is listed as endangered by the IUCN Red List of Threatened Species. The adult African wild dog has few natural predators, but habitat fragmentation, human persecution and domestic animal diseases have slashed its surviving numbers. According to the World Wildlife Fund, the African wild dog is one of the rarest and most endangered mammals in the world. Current population estimates are between 3,000 and 6,600, with only about 1,400 of these being breeding adults.

The African wild dog conservation program at Erindi Private Game Reserve began in 2007, when owner Gert Joubert decided to create a safe haven for a natural African wild dog population, and two groups of animals were brought into the reserve.

Despite natural and human-created conflicts over the years, causing some ups and downs for the project, at present there is a strong pack of 23 members on Erindi, which are carefully monitored and vaccinated regularly due to their susceptibility to domestic-animal-borne diseases.

Herbivores 
The large herbivores on Erindi include the African elephant, hippopotamus, Southern giraffe, and common eland.

Medium-sized herbivores include the Hartmann’s mountain zebra, Plains zebra, waterbuck, springbok, impala, Greater kudu, blesbok, Black wildebeest, Blue wildebeest, Red hartebeest, and gemsbok (oryx).

Small herbivores can be found in a range of territories across Erindi Private Game Reserve. Species like the Common duiker, Steenbuck, Klipspringer, Damara (Kirk's) dik-dik, Rock hyrax and Scrub hare.

Omnivores 
The common warthog is the only well-known endemic omnivore on Erindi.

Insectivores 
Erindi habitats support the aardvark (Orycteropus afer), a nocturnal burrowing mammal native to Africa. It uses a long snout to sniff out food, mainly ants and termites, which it digs out using sharp claws and powerful legs. Several species of rodents and bats also inhabit the area, feeding on insect populations.

Pangolin Project 
A species of pangolin or scaly anteater, called the ground pangolin (Manis temminckii) is a solitary, nocturnal mammal that lives in savannah woodland and scrub habitats in southern, central, and east Africa. Its diet consists mainly of ants and termites which it scoops up with its long, specially adapted tongue. Pangolin populations worldwide are sharply decreasing due to hunting, illegal poaching, and habitat degradation.

The world's most trafficked mammal, pangolins are being illegally poached in unsustainable numbers. All eight living pangolin species are listed from  'vulnerable to extinction' to 'critically endangered', on the IUCN Red List of Threatened Species.

Many pangolins (Manis temminckii) have been located on Erindi, and VHF tracking transmitters affixed to their scales to enable research and monitoring of these wild animals.

Birds 
Erindi is home to over 300 endemic bird species.

San Rock Art 
On Erindi Private Game Reserve, evidence suggests that ancient tribes once inhabited the region, with more than 100 individually engraved animal depictions discovered on Erindi’s one particular rock site. The National Museum’s Rock Art Department of South Africa surveyed the area and confirmed that the rock art on Erindi’s “Big Bushman” Mountain is fine-lined San engravings. The San are hunter-gatherer people, indigenous to southern Africa. They belong to the Khoisan group that speak the “click” languages. Researchers' interpretation of the San people is that their beliefs and rituals are very much a part of their art.

Some of the animal engravings include; giraffe, elephant, eland, hyena, ostrich, kudu, reptiles, buffalo and other plains game. According to the National Museum’s Rock Art Department, the rock depictions on Erindi are over 700 years old. San rock paintings are usually found in caves and on large boulders, and in many cases, these caves were used as shelters. San rock engravings are cut onto the rock surface and usually found in rocky outcrops and riverbeds. Today, there are still San families living on the reserve, but since they are a nomadic tribe, they tend to disappear from time to time. To see and learn about San mythology and their art, Erindi offers several educational opportunities.

Gallery

References

External links 
Erindi Private Game Reserve official website

Nature reserves in Namibia